The 1983 Cork Intermediate Football Championship was the 48th staging of the Cork Intermediate Football Championship since its establishment by the Cork County Board in 1909.

The final replay was played on 30 October 1983 at the Ballinspittle Grounds, between Passage and O'Donovan Rossa, in what was their first ever meeting in the final. Passage won the match by 1-06 to 0-07 to claim their first ever championship title.

Results

Final

References

Cork Intermediate Football Championship